Macrophage-capping protein (CAPG) also known as actin regulatory protein CAP-G is a protein that in humans is encoded by the CAPG gene.

Function 

This gene encodes a member of the gelsolin/villin family of actin-regulatory proteins. The encoded protein reversibly blocks the barbed ends of F-actin filaments in a Ca2+ and phosphoinositide-regulated manner, but does not sever preformed actin filaments. By capping the barbed ends of actin filaments, the encoded protein contributes to the control of actin-based motility in non-muscle cells. Alternatively spliced transcript variants have been observed, but have not been fully described.

References

Further reading